Mark Kiprotich Mutai (born 23 March 1978), also spelled Muttai, is a runner from Kenya, who specializes in 400 metres. He is a Commonwealth Games gold medallist.

He competed at the 2009 world championships in Berlin, Germany, but did not advance from the heats.

In 2010 he was part of the Kenyan 4x400 metres relay team that won gold at the 2010 African Championships in Athletics. In the individual event he was fourth, despite recording the same time as bronze medallist Gary Kikaya of DR Congo.

Mutai was part of the African 4x400 metres relay team that finished third at the 2010 IAAF Continental Cup.

He won 400 metres gold medal at the 2010 Commonwealth Games.

He is affiliated to Kenyan Armed Forces.

Competition record

References

External links
 

1978 births
Kenyan male sprinters
Commonwealth Games gold medallists for Kenya
Athletes (track and field) at the 2010 Commonwealth Games
Athletes (track and field) at the 2014 Commonwealth Games
Living people
Commonwealth Games silver medallists for Kenya
Commonwealth Games medallists in athletics
African Games gold medalists for Kenya
African Games medalists in athletics (track and field)
African Games bronze medalists for Kenya
Athletes (track and field) at the 2011 All-Africa Games
Medallists at the 2010 Commonwealth Games